Thomas Chester may refer to:

Thomas Morris Chester (1834–1892), American war correspondent, lawyer and soldier in the American Civil War
Tommy Chester (1907–1979), footballer
Tom Chester, one of the United States national amateur boxing middleweight champions
Thomas Chester (died 1583), MP for Bristol and Gloucestershire
Thomas Chester (1696–1763), MP for Gloucestershire
Thomas Chester (bishop), Anglican bishop of Elphin

See also